Mark Helias (born October 1, 1950) is an American double bass player and composer born in New Brunswick, New Jersey.

He started playing the double bass at the age of 20, and studied with Homer Mensch at Rutgers University from 1971 to 1974, then at Yale University's School of Music from 1974 to 1976. He teaches at Sarah Lawrence College, The New School, and SIM (School for Improvised Music).

Helias has performed with a wide variety of musicians, first and foremost with trombonist Ray Anderson, with whom he led the ironic 1980s avant-funk band Slickaphonics, and a trio with Gerry Hemingway on drums, formed in the late 1970s, later named BassDrumBone. Helias has also performed with members of Ornette Coleman's band, Don Cherry, Dewey Redman, and Ed Blackwell, and with musicians affiliated with the AACM, such as Anthony Braxton and Muhal Richard Abrams.

Since 1984 Mark Helias has released twelve recordings under his own name and further albums leading the archetypal improvising trio Open Loose since the late 1990s. The group comprises Helias on bass, first Ellery Eskelin, then Tony Malaby on tenor saxophone and Tom Rainey on drums.

Recognition/Awards
2010 - American Composers Orchestra Reading Commission,
2007 - Chamber Music America Grant for New Works, 
2006 - Distinguished Alumnus Award Livingston College, 
1991 - Meet the Composer/Reader's Digest Commission, 
1990, 1993, 1995, 1996, 2000 - Arts International Travel Grant,
1988, 1994 - NYFA Grant in Music Composition,
1984, 1985, 1989, 1990, 1991, 1995 - NEA Grant in Jazz Performance,
1981 - CAPS Grant in Music Composition,

Discography

As leader
 Music For Big Band (Radio Legs, 2020)
 Roof Rights (Radio Legs, 2020)
 Available Light (Radio Legs, 2020)
 Fictionary (GM Recordings, 1998)
 Loopin' the Cool (Enja, 1995)
 Attack the Future (Enja, 1992)
 Desert Blue (Enja, 1989)
 The Current Set (Enja, 1987)
 Split Image (Enja, 1984)

With Open Loose
 The Third Proposition (Radio Legs, 2020)
 The Signal Maker (Intakt, 2015)
 Explicit – Live at the Sunset (Marge, 2011)
 Strange Unison (Radio Legs, 2008)
 Atomic Clock (Radio Legs, 2006)
 Verbs of Will (Radio Legs, 2004)
 New School (Enja, 2001) Tony Malaby replaces Eskelin
 Come Ahead Back... (E1/Koch Jazz, 1998) with Ellery Eskelin and Tom Rainey

Collaborations
Duo with Jane Ira Bloom
Some Kind of Tomorrow (Radiolegs Music, 2020)
With Sophia Domancich and Andrew Cyrille
Courtepointe - Live at the Sunside (Marge, 2012)
With Terrence McManus and Gerry Hemingway
Transcendental Numbers (NoBusiness, 2011)
With Michael Moore, Alex Maguire, and Han Bennink
White Widow (Ramboy, 2001)
With Mark Dresser
The Marks Brothers (De Werf, 2000)
With Daniele D'Agaro and U.T. Gandhi
Gentle Ben (Nota, 1999)
With Christy Doran, Bobby Previte, Gary Thomas
Corporate Art (JMT, 1991)
With Slickaphonics
Live (Teldec, 1988)
Check Your Head at the Door (Teldec, 1986)
Humatomic Energy (Blue Heron, 1985)
Modern Life (Enja, 1984)
Wow Bag (Enja, 1982)
With Ray Anderson and Gerry Hemingway a.k.a. BassDrumBone
The Long Road - BassDrumBone with Jason Moran and Joe Lovano (Auricle, 2017)
The Other Parade (Clean Feed, 2011)
The Line Up (Clean Feed, 2006)
March of Dimes (Data, 2002)
(Hence the Reason) (Enja, 1997)
Wooferlo (Soul Note, 1989) first album as BassDrumBone
Cooked to Perfection (Auricle, 1999; Compilation of rec. from 1986, 1987, and 1996)
You Be (Minor Music, 1986)
Oahspe (Auricle, 1979)

As sideman
With Ralph Alessi and Modular Theatre
Open Season (RKM Music, 2008)
With Barry Altschul
Irina (Soul Note, 1983)
Brahma (Sackville, 1980)
Somewhere Else (Moers Music, 1979)
With Ray Anderson
Wishbone (Justin Time, 1991)
Right Down Your Alley (Soul Note, 1984)
With the Ed Blackwell Project
What It Is? Ed Blackwell Project Vol. 1 (Enja, 1993)
What It Be Like? Ed Blackwell Project Vol. 2 (Enja, 1994)
With Jane Ira Bloom
Wild Lines: Improvising Emily Dickenson (Outline, 2017)
Early Americans (Outline, 2016)
Wingwalker (Outline, 2011)
Mental Weather (Outline, 2008)
With Anthony Braxton
Six Compositions: Quartet (Antilles, 1982)
Quintet (Basel) 1977 (hatOLOGY, 2001)
With Don Cherry
Live at the Bracknell Jazz Festival, 1986 (BBC, 2002)
With Marilyn Crispell
Storyteller (ECM, 2003)
With Franco D'Andrea
Sei brani inediti (Red, 1991)
No Idea of Time (Red, 1984)
My One and Only Love (Red, 1983)
With Anthony Davis
Song for the Old World (India Navigation, 1978)
With Benoît Delbecq Unit
Benoît Delbecq and Fred Hersch Double Trio - Fun House (Songlines, 2013)
Phonetics (Songlines, 2005)
With Paul Dunmall Sun Quartet
Ancient and Future Airs (Clean Feed, 2009)
With Marty Ehrlich
The Long View (Enja, 2002)
Dark Woods Ensemble – Sojourn (Tzadik, 1999)
Dark Woods Ensemble – Live Wood (Music & Arts, 1997)
Dark Woods Ensemble – Just Before the Dawn (New World, 1995)
With Ricardo Gallo's Tierra de Nadie
The Great Fine Line (Clean Feed, 2011)
With Dennis González NY Quartet
Dance of the Soothsayer's Tongue (Live at Tonic) (Clean Feed, 2007)
NY Midnight Suite (Clean Feed, 2004) 
With Jerome Harris
Algorithms (Minor, 1986)
With Gerry Hemingway
The Whimbler (Clean Feed, 2005)
Outerbridge Crossing (Sound Aspects, 1989)
Kwambe (Auricle, 1978)
With Peter Herborn
Traces of Trane (JMT, 1992)
With David Lopato
Inside Outside (Enemy, 1991)
With Joe Lovano
Rush Hour (Blue Note, 1994)
With Michael Moore
Bering (Ramboy, 1998)
Chicoutimi (Ramboy, 1994)
Home Game (Ramboy, 1992)
With Simon Nabatov
The Master and Margarita (Leo, 2001)
Tough Customer (Enja, 1993)
With Operazone (Bill Laswell-Alan Douglas-Karl Berger-Project)
The Redesign (Knitting Factory, 2000)
With Jim Pepper
Comin' and Goin' (Europa, 1983)
With Bobby Previte
Music of the Moscow Circus (Gramavision, 1991)
With Enrico Rava
Flat Fleet (Philology, 2005)
With Dewey Redman
The Struggle Continues (ECM, 1982)
Musics (Galaxy, 1978)
Soundsigns (Galaxy, 1978)
With Joe Rosenberg
Do What We Must Do (CIMP, 2002)
With Roswell Rudd and Heather Masse
 August Love Song (Red House, 2016)
With Samo Šalamon
Government Cheese (Fresh Sound New Talent, 2007; rec. 2004)
Two Hours (Fresh Sound New Talent, 2006; rec. 2004)
With Dave Schnitter
Glowing (Muse, 1981)

References

External links
Mark Helias official site

1950 births
Living people
Musicians from New Brunswick, New Jersey
American jazz double-bassists
Male double-bassists
American jazz composers
American male jazz composers
Sarah Lawrence College faculty
Rutgers University alumni
CIMP artists
Enja Records artists
Yale University alumni
21st-century double-bassists
21st-century American male musicians
Intakt Records artists
MNRK Music Group artists
NoBusiness Records artists